Thibault Bazin (born 27 October 1984) is a French Republican politician who has represented Meurthe-et-Moselle's 4th constituency in the National Assembly since 2017.

Political career 
Bazin was re-elected in the 2022 French legislative election.

References

External links 
 National Assembly biography

1984 births
Living people
21st-century French politicians
Deputies of the 15th National Assembly of the French Fifth Republic
The Republicans (France) politicians
Politicians from Nancy, France
Deputies of the 16th National Assembly of the French Fifth Republic
Members of Parliament for Meurthe-et-Moselle